Michael Young Min Kim (born 10 June 1973) is a Canadian soccer manager who is assistant coach of South Korea.

Career

Playing career

Kim played college soccer for the Louisville Cardinals.

Managerial career

In 2007, he was appointed assistant manager of South Korea U23. In 2008, he was appointed consultant of English Premier League side Manchester United. In 2015, Kim was appointed manager of Daejeon Hana Citizen in the South Korean top flight.

After that, he was appointed assistant manager of Chinese second division club Shanghai Shenxin. In 2017, he was appointed assistant manager of FC Anyang in the South Korean second division. In 2018, Kim was appointed assistant manager of South Korea.

References

Canadian people of South Korean descent
Canadian soccer players
Living people
Expatriate soccer players in the United States
Expatriate football managers in South Korea
Association footballers not categorized by position
Canadian soccer coaches
1973 births